Volodarsk is a town and the administrative center of Volodarsky District in Nizhny Novgorod Oblast, Russia, located on the Seyma River (Oka's tributary)  west of Nizhny Novgorod, the administrative center of the oblast. Population:

History
The village of Seyma on the Seyma River was first mentioned in the 15th century. Seyma's branch settlement of Olgino was renamed Volodarsk in 1920, after V. Volodarsky, a Russian revolutionary. In 1932, Volodarsk was granted urban-type settlement status, which absorbed the original village of Seyma. Town status was granted to it in 1956.

Administrative and municipal status
Within the framework of administrative divisions, Volodarsk serves as the administrative center of Volodarsky District. As an administrative division, it is incorporated within Volodarsky District as the town of district significance of Volodarsk. As a municipal division, the town of district significance of Volodarsk is incorporated within Volodarsky Municipal District as Volodarsk Urban Settlement.

References

Notes

Sources

Cities and towns in Nizhny Novgorod Oblast
Volodarsky District, Nizhny Novgorod Oblast